The Maxim Cup (맥심커피배) is a South Korean Go competition.

Outline 
The Maxim Cup is sponsored by Dong Suh Foods. The players are selected with any active 9p's and they are pitted against each other.

Each player has 10 minutes of time with five 40-second byoyomi periods. The komi is 6.5 points. The winner's prize is 50 million won and the runner-up's prize is 20 million won.

Past winners

References

External links
Korea Baduk Association (in Korean)

Maxim Cup
2000 establishments in South Korea